Rafael Muñoz Núñez (January 24, 1925 – February 19, 2010) was the bishop of the  Roman Catholic Diocese of Aguascalientes in Mexico. Ordained on March 24, 1951, Muñoz Núñez was appointed bishop of the Roman Catholic Diocese of Zacatecas on July 20, 1972, and was ordained on September 29, 1972. He was appointed bishop of the Aguascalientes diocese on June 1, 1984, retiring on May 18, 1998.

See also

Notes

20th-century Roman Catholic bishops in Mexico
1925 births
2010 deaths